USS Antaeus (AS-21/AG-67) was a commercial passenger liner that the United States Navy acquired in World War II. She was SS Saint John from 1932 until 1941 before the US Navy acquired her and commissioned her as Antaeus. From 1941 to 1943, she was a submarine tender; she was later redesignated AG-67 and used as a troop transport from 1943 to 1944. In 1945, she was converted to a hospital ship, renamed USS Rescue (AH-18), and served in the Pacific War. Decommissioned in 1946, she was sold for scrap in 1958.

Civilian service
Newport News Shipbuilding & Dry Dock Company, Newport News, Virginia built Saint John in 1932 as a passenger liner for Eastern Steamship Lines. Saint John and her sister ship  entered coastal service for New York – Yarmouth – Halifax or Saint John. From 1938 to 1940 the ship also ran in New York-Bermuda or Nassau service. In 1939, the ship was chartered to the United States Lines for one voyage to carry American construction workers to air base projects in Bermuda. Acquired by the Navy on 24 April 1941 the ship was renamed Antaeus (AS-21) and commissioned on 17 May 1941.

World War II service

As USS Antaeus
Following her commissioning, the submarine tender operated in the Caribbean. She took part in training exercises and made repairs to the American submarines patrolling in those waters. Antaeus finished this task in September 1943, when she was assigned to transport duties and was redesignated AG-67. The ship then began shuttling troops to points in the Caribbean, the Panama Canal Zone, and to Argentia, Newfoundland, from bases at New York City and Davisville, Rhode Island.

As hospital ship USS Rescue
Antaeus entered the Brooklyn Navy Yard, New York City, on 28 December 1944. There she was converted to a hospital ship. On 18 January 1945 she was renamed Rescue and redesignated (AH-18). After her sea trials she got underway for the Pacific Ocean theater of action.

She arrived off Okinawa on 13 June, embarked men wounded in the fighting ashore, survived unscathed despite almost constant Japanese air attack against Allied shipping in the area, and safely delivered her patients to a hospital on Guam.

With a bed capacity of 792 and a complement of 440, Rescue provided hospital services, consultation, preventative medicine, and casualty evacuation. 
 
After a short upkeep period, Rescue joined the United States Third Fleet on 5 July. She supported 3d Fleet ships conducting carrier strikes and bombardment of the Japanese home islands. The ship would rendezvous with the combatant vessels and take on casualties by breeches buoy both at night and under battle conditions. Upon the conclusion of World War II, Rescue sailed into Tokyo Bay with the 3d Fleet and began the medical screening of Allied prisoners of war and shuttling them from various prison camps to the base at Yokohama.

Post-war activity
In late September, the ship arrived at Guam where she discharged a few former prisoners whose home had been on that island. Rescue then proceeded to San Francisco, California. She was decommissioned on 29 June 1946 and was transferred to the U.S. Maritime Administration.

She was stricken from the Navy List on 15 August 1946. The ship was put in permanent reserve on 28 September 1948 in Olympia, Washington, and remained there until being sold for scrap in October of that year. She was scrapped by Dulien Steel Products, in Washington.

Honors and awards
Rescue earned two battle stars for her World War II service:
 Okinawa Gunto operation
 3d Fleet operations against Japan

References

Bibliography

External links
 
 HISTORY OF USS RESCUE (AH 18) (EX USS ANTAEUS AS-21, AG-67) (November 1952) (U.S. Navy. NAVAL HISTORY DIVISION. SHIPS' HISTORIES SECTION)
 NavSource Online: Service Ship Photo Archive - AS-21 / AG-67 Antaeus - AH-18 Rescue

1932 ships
Hospital ships of the United States Navy
Passenger ships of the United States
Ships built in Newport News, Virginia
Steamships of the United States
Submarine tenders of the United States Navy
Submarine tenders
Transports of the United States Navy
World War II auxiliary ships of the United States